The men's long jump event at the 1950 British Empire Games was held on 7 February at the Eden Park in Auckland, New Zealand.

Results

References

Athletics at the 1950 British Empire Games
1950